The Georges Lemaître ATV, or Automated Transfer Vehicle 5 (ATV-5), was a European uncrewed cargo spacecraft, named after the Belgian astronomer Georges Lemaître. The spacecraft was  launched during the night of 29 July 2014 (23:44 GMT, 20:44 local time, 30 July 01:44 CEST), on a mission to supply the International Space Station (ISS) with propellant, water, air, and dry cargo. It was the fifth and final ATV to be built and launched. Georges Lemaître was constructed in Turin, Italy, and Bremen, Germany. Cargo loading was completed in Guiana Space Center on 23 July 2014.

Georges Lemaître was launched on an Ariane 5ES rocket from the Guiana Space Centre in Kourou, French Guiana. The launch was conducted by Arianespace on behalf of the European Space Agency.

Artist Katie Paterson sent artwork to the International Space Station aboard ATV-5.

Mission payload 

Georges Lemaître ferried 6.6 tonnes of experiments, spare parts, clothing, food, fuel, air, oxygen and water to the ISS. Included was a Haptics-1 joystick which is an advanced force feedback joystick to be used for physiological experiments on tactile feedback.

In addition to transporting cargo ATV-5 performed 2 experiments:

LIRIS (Laser InfraRed Imaging Sensors) was a new autonomous rendezvous sensor set that allowed future ships to dock with uncooperative targets, like debris or sample capsules - the ATV used a demonstration version of this advanced sensor system instead of the standard optical sensors bouncing light off the reflectors around ISS docking port.

Break-Up Camera recorded the ATV in infrared as it disintegrated during atmospheric reentry above the Pacific Ocean. After completion of recording, a reinforced SatCom capsule doubling as a prototype "black box" began transmitting the recorded data to one of the Iridium satellites through the gap in plasma behind the vehicle.
One message was received, which included accelerometer, magnetometer and temperature readings. Transmission of the nearly 6000 images, which were apparently successfully recorded, would have involved further messages. It was unclear why but none of these were received.

ATV missions

References

External links

ESA - ATV

Automated Transfer Vehicles
Spacecraft launched in 2014
Spacecraft which reentered in 2015
Supply vehicles for the International Space Station